Gista Putri (born in Jakarta, Indonesia, 2 August 1987) is an Indonesian actress.

Early life 
Gista is of Sundanese descent from her parents Agusdin Susanto and Susilowati from Kuningan, West Java, in Sawahwaru. She holds a law degree from the Faculty of Law, Trisakti University, Jakarta.

Career 
Putri began her career as a model in a teen magazine. After she became a finalist in a teen magazine model event, she received further offers to take part in various photoshoots and was cast in several music videos.

She made her film debut while finishing her studies. Gista appeared in the role of Laras, with the actors Ira Wibowo, Sophie Navita, Christian Bautista and Maribeth in the film  Simfoni Luar Biasa, a story of children with special needs.

Since 2014 she has hosted music and entertainment programs on NET television station, and has appeared in the sitcoms Keluarga Masa Kini and The East.

On 20 of September 2015, she married Wishnutama Kusubandio, Ceo of NET. Mediatama Televisi.

Filmography

Movies 
 Simfoni Luar Biasa (2011)

Sitcom 
 The Coffee Bean Show
 Keluarga Masa Kini
 The East

Advertisements 
 Simpati Freedom Telkomsel

Quiz 
 Super Family

Presenter 
 Entertainment News (2013 - 2015)

FTV serials 
 Mengejar Cinta Olga RCTI
 Mengejar Cinta Olga (Lagi) RCTI
 Antara Mars, Venus, Dan Boo RCTI
 Kolak Cinta Aisah RCTI
 Jodoh Buat Romo SCTV
 Cewek Jagoan Malioboro SCTV
 Jadikan Aku Cinta Terakhirmu SCTV
 Pembantuku Jago Kungfu SCTV
 I Love 21 SCTV
 Menjemput Cintaku Kembali SCTV
 Pacaran Seminggu SCTV
 Jamu Gendong Gina SCTV
 Gadis Manis Dalam Taxi SCTV
 Haruskah Ku Bilang Cinta Pada Selly SCTV
 Nada Cinta Dari Terminal SCTV
 Cinta Super Jadul SCTV
 Calon Istri Yang Sempurna SCTV
 Jodoh Pasti Bertemu SCTV
 Aku Takut Bilang Cinta Padamu SCTV
 Ku Lihat Cinta Di Matanya SCTV
 Diam-Diam Aku Suka Dia SCTV

Music videos model 
 Noah - Separuh Aku
 Ada Band - Sendiri
 VC HEYHO - Stasiun Tua
 Sherina - Pergilah Kau
 Emily - Permaisuriku (Starlite)
 ST 12 - Cinta Tak Harus Memiliki
 D'Bagindas - Tak Seindah Malam kemarin
 Naff - Tak Butuh Jawaban
 Rossa - Ku Menunggu
 Salju - Permaisuriku
 Repvblik - Aku Yang Terluka

References 

1987 births
Living people
People from Jakarta
Indonesian female models
Indonesian film actresses
Indonesian television actresses
Javanese people
Indonesian Muslims